Peter Cross may refer to:
 Peter Cross (painter) (c. 1645/50–1724), English miniature painter
 Peter Cross (engraver) (1815–1862), American engraver
 Pierre Cressoy (1924–1980), French actor sometimes credited as Peter Cross
 Peter Cross (illustrator) (born 1951), British illustrator
 Peter Hulme-Cross, British politician
 Peter Cross (rugby union), English rugby mascot

See also
 Cross of St. Peter